Črni Vrh v Tuhinju is a small settlement in the Tuhinj Valley in the Municipality of Kamnik in the Upper Carniola region of Slovenia.

Name
The name of the settlement was changed from Črni Vrh to Črni Vrh v Tuhinju in 1953.

References

External links 
Črni Vrh v Tuhinju on Geopedia

Populated places in the Municipality of Kamnik